Brandon Charles Berger (born February 21, 1975) is an American former Major League Baseball outfielder who played for the Kansas City Royals from 2001 to 2004.

Berger attended Beechwood High School in Fort Mitchell, Kentucky. He was drafted by the Chicago White Sox in high school, but went to college at Eastern Kentucky University. In 1995, he played collegiate summer baseball with the Cotuit Kettleers of the Cape Cod Baseball League. He was drafted by the Kansas City Royals in the 14th round of the 1996 Major League Baseball Draft, and signed on June 4, 1996. He also owns his own Baseball Training Center, called At The Yard.

References

External links

1975 births
Living people
Baseball players from Kentucky
Sportspeople from Covington, Kentucky
Major League Baseball outfielders
Kansas City Royals players
Lansing Lugnuts players
Omaha Royals players
Memphis Redbirds players
Eastern Kentucky Colonels baseball players
Cotuit Kettleers players